Stella is a small lunar impact crater on the eastern side of Mare Serenitatis.  It is a fresh crater with a prominent bright ray system.  It is to the southwest of the larger Ching-Te, and west of the Taurus-Littrow valley where Apollo 17 landed in 1972.

The name of the crater was approved by the IAU in 1976.

References

 
 
 
 
 
 
 
 
 
 
 
 

Impact craters on the Moon